Khurzad (also Romanized as Khūrzād; also known as Khūrzād-e Bālā) is a village in Masabi Rural District, in the Central District of Sarayan County, South Khorasan Province, Iran. At the 2006 census, its population was 157, in 51 families.

References 

Populated places in Sarayan County